The de Havilland DH.110 Sea Vixen is a British twin-engine, twin boom-tailed, two-seat, carrier-based fleet air-defence fighter flown by the Royal Navy's Fleet Air Arm during the 1950s through to the early 1970s. The Sea Vixen was designed by the de Havilland Aircraft Company during the late 1940s at its Hatfield aircraft factory in Hertfordshire, developed from the company's earlier first generation jet fighters. It was later called the Hawker Siddeley Sea Vixen after de Havilland was absorbed by the Hawker Siddeley Corporation in 1960.

The Sea Vixen had the distinction of being the first British two-seat combat aircraft to achieve supersonic speed, albeit not in level flight. Operating from British aircraft carriers, it was used in combat over Tanganyika and over Yemen during the Aden Emergency. In 1972, the Sea Vixen was phased out in favour of the American-made McDonnell Douglas Phantom FG.1 interceptor. There have been no flying Sea Vixens since 2017.

Development

Origins
In 1946, the de Havilland Aircraft Company conducted discussions with the British Admiralty on its requirements for a future jet-powered all-weather, radar-equipped fighter. From these talks, it became clear that the aircraft would need a crew of two to handle its radar and navigation equipment, as well as to fly the fighter, and that two engines were required for a safety factor over the ocean, and that swept wings were desirable. The fighter would also have a moderate wing loading for manoeuvrability at altitude and acceptable takeoff and landing performance from aircraft carriers. Highly effective wing flaps would be needed for landing and taking off.

de Havilland decided to pursue development of a design to meet the requirements of the British Royal Navy. The proposed aircraft, which was designated as the DH.110 by de Havilland, was a twin-engined all-weather fighter.

The design of the DH 110 used the twin-boom-tail design layout of the de Havilland Vampire and de Havilland Venom. It had an all-metal structure, 45-degree swept wings, and an armament of four 30 mm ADEN cannons. The DH 110 was to be powered by a pair of Rolls-Royce Avon turbojet engines, each capable of generating  of thrust, which would allow the aircraft to become supersonic in a shallow dive. The DH 110 had the distinction of being the first British two-seat combat plane to achieve supersonic speed.

In January 1947, specifications N.40/46 and F.44/46 were issued by the British Air Ministry for similar night fighters to equip the Fleet Air Arm (FAA) and Royal Air Force (RAF). de Havilland submitted its proposal for the DH 110 to both services. As initially submitted the RAF version had Metrovick F.9 engines, although these would soon be known as the Armstrong Siddeley Sapphire when Metrovick sold its engine division.

In response, nine DH 110 prototypes were ordered for the RAF (together with four of the competing Gloster Javelin) and four prototypes for the Fleet Air Arm.

By early 1949 the DH.110 design was expected to be adaptable to fulfil four requirements: F4/48,  F5/49 (a long range RAF fighter), N.40/46 (naval night fighter) and N.8/49 (naval strike aircraft). To this end the prototypes required would be three for F.4/48, four for common RAF and RN development, and two each for the other three roles and by July the authorities were ready to order the 13 prototypes 

In 1949, however, the Royal Navy decided to procure the de Havilland Sea Venom which, as a development of an existing aircraft, was cheaper, and would be available sooner to meet its immediate needs for a jet-powered night fighter to replace its fleet of piston-engined de Havilland Sea Hornets and Vought F4U Corsairs. The RAF decided to cut its order to two prototypes. Despite this setback, de Havilland elected to continue work on the DH 110 while trying to recapture official interest in the type.

On 26 September 1951, an initial prototype was completed and conducted its maiden flight from the Hatfield Aerodrome, flown by the test pilot John Cunningham. Early flight tests of the prototype demonstrated that the aircraft's performance exceeded expectations. By the following year, the prototype was regularly flying in excess of  the speed of sound.

However, tragedy struck while the first prototype DH 110 (serial number WG236) was demonstrated at the Farnborough Airshow on 6 September 1952. Following a demonstration of its ability to break the sound barrier during a low level flight, the aircraft disintegrated and debris landed in the midst of spectators killing 31 people, including the crew of two, the test pilot John Derry and his flight-test observer, Tony Richards.

Subsequent investigation of the accident traced the failure to faulty design of the wing leading edge section ahead of the main spar. The design had been satisfactory for the earlier Vampire and Venom but not for the higher stresses induced by the rolling pull-out manoeuvre at 650 mph flown by the DH110 prototype at Farnborough. The leading edge skin, without the extra reinforcing structure that would be added later, buckled, which resulted in the outer portions of the swept-back wings being torn off (similar display routines had been flown on preceding days by the other prototype DH110 which had an aerodynamic fence providing external stiffening for the skin located precisely over the area where the buckling originated.). The subsequent shift in the DH 110's centre of pressure caused the aircraft to pitch up, the cockpit and tail sections breaking away and the engines being torn from the airframe by the g loading. One of the engines hit an area crowded with spectators at the end of the runway, causing the majority of the deaths. Sixty other spectators were injured by debris from the cockpit landing close to the main spectator enclosures alongside the runway. This incident led to a restructuring of safety regulations for air shows in the UK, and no member of the public died as a result of a British airshow flight for more than 62 years, until the crash of a Hawker Hunter warbird killed 11 people during the Shoreham Air Show on 22 August 2015.

Redesign and navalisation
In response to the loss of the first prototype de Havilland introduced modifications to the design which were implemented on the remaining second prototype. These changes included the adoption of an all-moving tailplane, and cambered leading edge extensions. The modified prototype did not return to flight until July 1954. As a result of these changes the DH 110 was no longer able to exceed the speed of sound, only reaching Mach 0.95 in a steep dive where its controls were immovable until passing . By this time, the Royal Air Force announced the abandonment of its interest in the DH 110, after deciding to buy the Gloster Javelin instead; However, the Fleet Air Arm had decided that it would adopt the aircraft as a replacement for its interim fleet of Sea Venoms. In February 1955, an order was placed for 110 navalised aircraft, which received the name Sea Vixen.

In addition to tailoring the aircraft for carrier-based operation by the Royal Navy, de Havilland implemented major changes to the Sea Vixen during its redesign. Throughout the 1950s, when the DH 110 design was still being evolved, major advances had occurred in subsystems such as weaponry, fire-control system, radar equipment, and cockpit instrumentation. The concept of an aircraft being an integrated weapons system had proliferated, where sensors such as the radar would be more directly tied into navigation and weapons systems. de Havilland included this concept in the design of the Sea Vixen. According to aviation author David Hobbs, it was the first British fighter aircraft to be designed in this manner.

In June 1955, a semi-navalised prototype, XF828, was completed for the purpose of conducting carrier flight deck suitability trials. For this purpose, XF828 featured several changes, including the alteration of the profile of the wing leading edges and the strengthening of the wings, as well as underwing fixture points for catapult launches, and a tailhook for arrested landings; however, the prototype lacked a wing folding mechanism, or racks for armaments. On 20 June 1955, this aircraft made its first flight from de Havilland's facility at Christchurch Airfield in Dorset. The following year, XF828 performed its first arrested deck landing on the Royal Navy's aircraft carrier .

In April 1956, the finalised production drawings were formally issued. The fully navalised production Sea Vixen featured a number of improvements over earlier development models. These included the addition of a powered folding wing system, reinforcement of the landing gear to withstand the additional stresses of carrier landings, a steerable nose wheel, a revised tail unit, and the redesigning of the fuselage to carry armament. On 20 March 1957, the first true Sea Vixen, designated as the Sea Vixen FAW.20 (fighter all-weather, later redesignated FAW.1), performed its first flight. This aircraft was promptly used for clearance trials, in particular for addressing handling problems; the second production aircraft was used for engineering trials and the third aircraft for conducting radar trials. On 2 July 1959, the first Sea Vixen-equipped squadron was formed.

Production Sea Vixens were manufactured at first by de Havilland at its former World War II Airspeed Ltd. "shadow factory" at Christchurch near Bournemouth, starting in March 1957. In August 1962, all production was moved to another de Havilland factory located at Hawarden, near Chester.

Further development

Beyond the initial FAW.1 model, de Havilland proceeded with the development of an improved variant, which was subsequently designated as the Sea Vixen FAW.2. This served as the successor to the FAW.1 and included many improvements. As well as Firestreak missiles, it could carry the Red Top air-to-air missile, four SNEB rocket pods, and the AGM-12 Bullpup air-to-ground missile.

Its enlarged tail boom allowed for additional fuel tanks in the "pinion" extensions above and in front of the wing leading edge, there was an improved escape system and additional room for more electronic countermeasures (ECM) equipment. However, the changes in aerodynamics meant that the 1,000 lb bomb could no longer be carried. Visually the FAW.1 and FAW.2 could be distinguished by the tail booms which extended forward over the wing leading edges of the FAW.2.

In 1962, the Sea Vixen FAW.2 conducted its maiden flight; the type entered service with frontline squadrons in 1964. Overall, a total of 29 FAW.2s were newly built along with a further 67 FAW.1s that were rebuilt and upgraded to FAW.2 standard. In 1966, the original FAW.1 begun to be phased out. In 1972, the career of the Sea Vixen FAW.2 came to an end.

The Admiralty had planned to replace the Sea Vixen with the McDonnell Douglas Phantom FG.1. Due to defence cuts, and following the decommissioning of HMS Eagle, only HMS Ark Royal underwent the conversion work to fly the new Phantom FG.1.

A small number of Sea Vixens subsequently saw service as drones, in which capacity they were redesignated as the Sea Vixen D.3. Only four aircraft were converted to the D.3 standard, though three more were dispatched to Farnborough to undergo conversion, but ultimately went unconverted. The last remaining airworthy Sea Vixen (XP924) was a D3 conversion. A number of other Sea Vixens became target tugs and were redesignated as the Sea Vixen TT.2.

Design

The de Havilland Sea Vixen was a jet-powered fleet defence fighter, equipped with a modern radar and air-to-air missiles for its primary role. When it entered service, it was the first British aircraft to be solely armed with missiles, rockets and bombs; this made it the first fighter aircraft operated by the Fleet Air Arm with no gun armament. The Sea Vixen FAW.1 was armed with four de Havilland Firestreak air-to-air missiles, while the Sea Vixen FAW.2 could also carry the later, more capable Red Top missile. The original DH.110 design offered to the RAF was armed with four cannon before soon being replaced with an all-missile armament. The Red Top homing head was pointed in the direction of the target by slaving it to the AI18 radar, which was operated by the observer.

In addition to its principal fleet-defence role, the Sea Vixen was also used in the ground-attack role for which it could be armed with two Microcell unguided two-inch (51 mm) rocket packs, Bullpup air-to-ground missiles, and four 500 lb (227 kg) or two 1,000 lb (454 kg) bombs. The Sea Vixen was equipped with a refuelling probe for aerial refuelling from tanker aircraft to extend its range. It could also be equipped as a tanker for refueling other aircraft. The Sea Vixen FAW.1 was cleared to carry the Red Beard free-fall nuclear bomb in the event of an "extreme operational emergency".

The Sea Vixen was powered by a pair of Rolls-Royce Avon 208 turbojet engines and could reach a maximum speed of 690 mph (1,110 km/h) and a range of up to 600 mi (1,000 km). It had a twin-boom tail configuration, as used on the earlier de Havilland Sea Vampire and Sea Venom fighter aircraft. The internal volume of the tail boom was used for both fuel and avionics, and was considerably enlarged for this purpose on the improved Sea Vixen FAW.2. The twin-boom tail reduced the length and height of the aircraft, which reduced the stowage area and head-room required onboard aircraft carriers; it also minimised asymmetry during single engine flying, reduced the length of the jet pipes and improved maintenance access.

The fuselage comprises several sections, the principal being the one-piece central and stub-wing assembly section. The front fuselage, composed of the pressurised cabin, the airbrake below the pressure flooring and the radar compartment, and its hinged radome are mounted upon four attachments on the forward face of the front spar. Various electrical compartments are located aft of the front spar, above the wing, which are accessible through hatches. The engines are installed within the main fuselage aft of the main box; they could be removed from the fuselage for servicing via detachable panels on the upper fuselage surface. Sections of the fuselage skin were chemically milled while other parts were machine milled. The powered folding wing made use of a pair of wing-fold joints which involved a total of six main attachment points.

The Sea Vixen had a crew of two, a pilot and a radar operator. The pilot's canopy was offset to the left-hand side of the fuselage, while the radar operator sat to the right completely within the fuselage, the latter gaining access to his position through a flush-fitting top hatch, nicknamed the "Coal Hole". The observer's position was darkened and located deeper down into the fuselage, improving the visibility of the radar imagery. Both positions were fitted with fully automated height adjustable Martin-Baker Mk.4 ejector seats, which were capable of being deployed under a range of conditions and circumstances, including the aircraft being submerged in water. Each crew member had a single centralised service connector comprising circuits that served ventilated g-suits as well as controls for humidity and temperature for crew comfort.

The flying controls of the Sea Vixen were relatively complex with a fully powered tailplane, ailerons, and rudder; these controls remained usable even in the absence of electrical power, such as in the event of a double engine failure. Actuation of the powered flight control surfaces was provided by a pair of independent hydraulic systems and typically featured variable gearing of control movements over differing speeds. An intricate three-section flap arrangement was employed, partially due to the nature of the wing's geometry. The navigation, flight instrumentation and communications equipment included ground and air position indicators, a reference gyro, an autopilot capable of maintaining altitude and speed as well as yaw and pitch damping, tactical air navigation system (TACAN), and ultra high frequency (UHF) radio system.

Operational history

The aircraft did not take part in any true wars during its career with the Fleet Air Arm though it took part in many operations. In 1961, President Abdul Karim Kassem of Iraq threatened to annex the neighbouring oil-rich state of Kuwait. In response to Kuwait's appeal for external help, the United Kingdom dispatched a number of ships to the region, including two fleet carriers. Sea Vixens aboard the fleet carriers flew patrols in the region, and Kassem's aggressive actions wilted in the face of the strong naval presence, thus averting a war over Kuwait.

In January 1964, trouble flared in the East African state of Tanganyika after the 1st and 2nd Tanganyika Rifles mutinied against the British officers and NCOs who, despite Tanganyika being independent, still commanded the regiment. The mutineers also seized the British High Commissioner and the airport at the capital Dar es Salaam. The UK responded by sending the light fleet carrier , accompanied by 45 Commando, Royal Marines. The Sea Vixens, flying off Centaur, performed a number of duties including the providing of cover for the Royal Marines who were landed in Tanganyika by helicopters. The operation "to restore Tanganyika to stability" ended in success. That same year, Sea Vixens of HMS Centaur saw service once again in the Persian Gulf, including the launch of air strikes against rebel forces, this time supporting British forces fighting against locals disgruntled by the loss of tolls in the Radfan. Later in 1964, HMS Centaurs 892 Squadron Sea Vixens stationed off Indonesia, helped to prevent an escalation of President Sukarno's Indonesia–Malaysia confrontation.

Sea Vixens saw further service during the 1960s, performing duties on Beira Patrol, a Royal Navy operation designed to prevent oil reaching landlocked Rhodesia via the then Portuguese colony of Mozambique. The Sea Vixen also saw service in the Far East.  In 1967, once again in the Persian Gulf, Sea Vixens helped cover the withdrawal from Aden. There were a number of Royal Navy warships involved, including the carriers ,  and HMS Eagle (carrying the Sea Vixens) and the LPD (Landing Platform Dock) .

The Sea Vixen also flew in an aerobatic role, performing in two Royal Navy display teams: Simon's Sircus and Fred's Five.

Of the 145 Sea Vixens constructed, 55 were lost in accidents. Two DH.110 development prototypes were also lost. The 55 Sea Vixens lost represented a loss rate of almost 38%. 30 (54%) of these were fatal incidents, 21 of which involved the death of both pilot and observer.

A small number of Sea Vixens were sent to FR Aviation at Tarrant Rushton airfield for conversion to D.3 drone standard, with some undergoing testing at RAF Llanbedr before the drone programme was abandoned. Among them was XP924, now G-CVIX, the only Sea Vixen to remain in flying condition, which has now been returned to 899 NAS colours. Formerly owned and operated by De Havilland Aviation, G-CVIX could be viewed at their hangar at Bournemouth Airport in Dorset, southern England, or at air shows around the UK. The Air Accident Investigation Branch published an enquiry into damage suffered by G-CVIX on landing at Bournemouth on 5 April 2012. On 16 September 2014, G-CVIX was transferred to Naval Aviation Ltd., a subsidiary of Fly Navy Heritage Trust and will be based at the Royal Naval Air Station Yeovilton in Somerset.

Operators

 Royal Navy Fleet Air Arm

Surviving aircraft

One Sea Vixen remained airworthy until 2017:
 Sea Vixen D.3 G-CVIX, the former XP924, registered until 2014 to DS Aviation (UK) at Bournemouth Airport, Dorset. It has a display of registration mark exemption to fly in its original Royal Navy markings as "XP924" coded "134". It originally flew with 899 Naval Air Squadron Fleet Air Arm as "134" from November 1968 until 1970 from HMS Eagle. The ownership of XP924 moved to the Fly Navy Heritage Trust – with a formal donation ceremony at RNAS Yeovilton on 16 September 2014 – to be maintained and operated from Yeovilton by Naval Aviation Ltd., a subsidiary of Fly Navy Heritage Trust. On 27 May 2017, XP924 performed an emergency wheels-up landing at Yeovilton after a hydraulic failure. The pilot was uninjured during the belly-landing. In November 2020, the trust announced that fundraising efforts and ongoing investment to return XP924 to flying condition had been suspended indefinitely.

The following complete airframes are on public display:

Australia
 Sea Vixen FAW.2 XJ490, Queensland Air Museum, Caloundra, Australia. Airframe complete, but internals removed.

United Kingdom
 Sea Vixen FAW.1 XJ481, Fleet Air Arm Museum, RNAS Yeovilton, Somerset. Part of the Museum's reserve collection.
 Sea Vixen FAW.1 XJ482, Norfolk and Suffolk Aviation Museum, Suffolk. The first Sea Vixen delivered to the Royal Navy.
 Sea Vixen FAW.2 XJ494, owned and maintained by Classic British Jets Collection, Bruntingthorpe Aerodrome, Leicestershire.
 Sea Vixen FAW.2 XJ560, Newark Air Museum, Nottinghamshire.
 Sea Vixen FAW.2 XJ565, de Havilland Aircraft Museum, Hertfordshire.
 Sea Vixen FAW.2 XJ571, Solent Sky, Hampshire.
 Sea Vixen FAW.2 XJ580, Tangmere Military Aviation Museum, West Sussex.
 Sea Vixen FAW.2 XN685, Midland Air Museum, Coventry.
 Sea Vixen FAW.2 XS576, IWM Duxford, Cambridgeshire.
 Sea Vixen TT.2 XS587, Gatwick Aviation Museum, Surrey.
 Sea Vixen FAW.2 XS590, Fleet Air Arm Museum, RNAS Yeovilton, Somerset. The last production Sea Vixen, built in 1966.

Specifications (Sea Vixen FAW.2)

See also

Notes

References

Notes

Citations

Bibliography
 Birtles, Philip. Postwar Military Aircraft 5: de Havilland Vampire, Venom and Sea Vixen. London: Ian Allan, 1986, 
 Birtles, Philip. "Sea Vixen: Britain's First Missile Specialist". Air International, April 1991, Vol. 40, No. 4, pp. 194–201. Stamford, UK: Key Publishing. .

 Brookes, Andrew. Crash! Military Aircraft Disasters, Accidents and Incidents, Shepperton, UK:Ian Allan, 1991. 
 Buttler, Tony. The de Havilland Sea Vixen. Air-Britain, 2007. 
Buttler, Tony. Secrets of the Sea Vixen: De Havilland's Awesome DH.110 Sea Vixe's Development History. Air Enthusiast 87, May–June 2000, pp. 49–61.  
 Buttler, Tony. X-Planes of Europe II: Military Prototype Aircraft from the Golden Age 1946–1974. Manchester, UK: Hikoki Publications, 2015. 
 Donald, David and Jon Lake, eds. Encyclopedia of World Military Aircraft. London: AIRtime Publishing, 1996. 
 Dyndal, Gjert Lage. Land Based Air Power Or Aircraft Carriers?: A Case Study of the British Debate about Maritime Air Power in the 1960s. Routledge, 2016. 
 Ellis, Guy. Britain's Jet Age: From the Meteor to the Sea Vixen. Amberley Publishing, 2016. 
 Ellis, Ken. Wrecks & Relics 25th Edition. Manchester, UK: Crecy Publishing, 2016. 
 Fiddler, Brian. Sea Vixen. Ilchester, UK: The Society of Friends of the Fleet Air Arm Museum, Fleet Air Arm Museum RNAS Yeovilton, 1985. 
 Gunston, Bill. Fighters of the Fifties. North Branch, Minnesota: Specialty Press Publishers, 1981. 

 Hobbs, Lt Cdr David. Aircraft of the Royal Navy Since 1945. Liskeard, UK: Maritime Books, 1982, 
 Hobbs, Lt Cdr David. British Aircraft Carriers: Design, Development & Service Histories. Seaforth Publishing, 2014. 
 Jackson, A. J. De Havilland Aircraft since 1909. London: Putnam, Third edition 1987. 
 Jones, Fred. Air Crash: The Clues in the Wreckage London: Robert Hale Limited 1985, 
 McCart, Neil. HMS "Centaur", 1943–72. Cheltenham, Gloucestershire, UK: Fan Publications, 1997. 
 Neal, Molly. "Sea Vixen." Flight, 5 February 1960, pp. 179–186.
 Nicholas, Jack. "Big Bangs for a Buck: Britain's Tactical Nuclear Forces 1960–1998". Air International, Vol. 69, No. 1, July 2005, pp. 45–49. 
 Noble, Bernard. Properly to Test: Book One "The Early Years". Spalding, UK: Old Forge Publishing, 2003. 
 Phipp, Mike Bournemouth's Airports – A History. Stroud, UK: Tempus Publishing, 2006. 
 Polmar, Norman. Aircraft Carriers: A History of Carrier Aviation and Its Influence on World Events, Volume II: 1946–2006. Potomac Books, 2008. 
 Taylor, John W. R. "De Havilland Sea Vixen". Combat Aircraft of the World from 1909 to the Present. New York: G.P. Putnam's Sons, 1969. 
 Winchester, Jim, ed. "De Havilland DH.110 Sea Vixen." Military Aircraft of the Cold War (The Aviation Factfile). London: Grange Books, 2006.

External links

 De Havilland Aviation Ltd – operates airworthy de Havilland jet aircraft, including the world's last airworthy Sea Vixen

 SeaVixen.org – Contains information on the aircraft, the squadrons and carriers and those that flew them
 The 1952 Farnborough Air Show crash (with pictures)
 Aeroplane Naval Aircraft Archive – De Havilland Sea Vixen
 Thunder & Lightnings – De Havilland Sea Vixen
 Interview with Sea Vixen display pilot – Lt Cdr Matt Whitfield

Sea Vixen
1950s British fighter aircraft
Twinjets
Twin-boom aircraft
Carrier-based aircraft
Mid-wing aircraft
Aircraft first flown in 1951